was a Japanese football team based in Okayama, Okayama Prefecture. They played in the Japan Football League, the fourth-tier of Japanese nationwide football leagues and the top level of amateur football in the country.

History 
The club was established in 2009 after Fagiano Okayama won the promotion to J. League in order to give more practice to youngsters and reserve players of the senior team. They began to play in the Okayama Prefectural league and soon afterward they won the championship and promotion to the Chugoku Regional League.

In 2012 they won third place in the All Japan Senior Football Championship and therefore participated in the Regional League promotion series but finished only fourth in the final group. The following year they won the Chugoku league and finished second in the Regional League promotion series, thus earning the right to play in the Japan Football League in 2014.

External links 
 Team's page on the official site 

 
Football clubs in Japan
Sports teams in Okayama Prefecture
Japanese reserve team football
Japan Football League clubs
Association football clubs established in 2009
2009 establishments in Japan
Defunct football clubs in Japan
2016 disestablishments in Japan
Association football clubs disestablished in 2016